Ex-Voto is an EP by the British band The Duke Spirit, released in the UK on 22 November 2007. The tracks "Lassoo" and "Dog Roses" later appeared on the band's second full-length album Neptune.

Track listing

2007 EPs
The Duke Spirit albums